Gille Na Naomh M'Arthur O'Bruin (died 1234) was an Irish priest (of Archdeacon of Roscommon) in the 13th century.

References 

1234 deaths
Year of birth unknown
13th-century Irish Roman Catholic priests
Archdeacons of Roscommon